Manolis Liapakis (born 11 June 1984) is a Greek footballer who currently plays for Doxa Drama.

References
 Guardian Football
 AEL 1964 FC Official

1984 births
Living people
Greek footballers
Egaleo F.C. players
Thrasyvoulos F.C. players
Xanthi F.C. players
Panthrakikos F.C. players
Iraklis Thessaloniki F.C. players
Doxa Drama F.C. players
PAS Giannina F.C. players
Association football defenders
Association football midfielders
Footballers from Ioannina